Bené Arnold is an American ballet dancer, she is currently a Distinguished Professor Emeritus at the University of Utah.

References

1935 births
Living people
University of Utah faculty
American ballerinas
American women academics
21st-century American women